In Inuit religion, A'akuluujjusi is considered the great creator mother, a primordial goddess, by Inuit.

Creation myth 
She created animals from her clothes. First, she made the caribou with tusks and the walrus with antlers. But that way, they were too dangerous for hunters going after them. So she changed her mind and swapped. 

She found the walrus was perfect with tusks. Yet, the caribou was running too fast to be caught by hunters. Therefore, she turned his belly hair against the wind to slow him down.

References

Creator goddesses
Inuit goddesses
Inuit mythology